Mejnoun (Possessed) is an album by Algerian musician and composer Safy Boutella, that was released in 1992 on the Indigo record label.

Track listing
All compositions and arrangements by Safy Boutella except "Sister's", which was arranged by Nguyên Lê.

 "Sud"  — 4:09
 "Orient"  — 8:20
 "Nomade"  — 5:25
 "Shiria"  — 5:23
 "Mejnoun"  — 6:32
 "Apres-Demain"  — 4:31
 "Khmous Alik"  — 6:29
 "Sister's"  — 3:51
 "Sourire"  — 2:06

Personnel
Karim Ziad – drums 
Youcef Boukella – bass
Nguyên Lê – guitar, guitar synthesiser
Dominique Pifarély – electric violin
Naná Vasconcelos – percussion
Noureddine Boutella – keyboards, guitar
Mokhtar Samba – drums on "Shiria" and "Khmous Alik"
Mejdoub Ftati – electric violin on "Orient"
Rabah Khalfa – percussion on "Orient"
Sylvie Ayoun – choir on "Sud"
Safy Boutella – compositions and arrangements, keyboards, programming, chant, percussion

References

1992 albums
Safy Boutella albums